Segi Naoki (瀬木直貴, born 1963 in Mie Prefecture, Japan) is a Japanese film director.

Filmography
Saka no ue no Maria (坂の上のマリア, lit. "Maria on the hill") (2001)
Izure no Mori ka Aoki Umi (いずれの森か青き海) （2003）
Sennenbi (2004)

External links
JMDb profile 

1963 births
Living people
Japanese film directors
People from Mie Prefecture
21st-century Japanese people
Date of birth missing (living people)